Sydney Asiodu (born 28 January 1944) is a Nigerian sprinter. He competed in the men's 4 × 100 metres relay at the 1964 Summer Olympics.

References

External links
 

1944 births
Living people
Athletes (track and field) at the 1964 Summer Olympics
Athletes (track and field) at the 1966 British Empire and Commonwealth Games
Nigerian male sprinters
Olympic athletes of Nigeria
Place of birth missing (living people)
Commonwealth Games competitors for Nigeria